Ooperipatus caesius is a species of velvet worm in the Peripatopsidae family. This species has 15 pairs of legs. It is found in Victoria, Australia.

References

Animals described in 2000
Fauna of Victoria (Australia)
Onychophorans of Australasia
Onychophoran species